van der Jagt, Vander Jagt or Vanderjagt is a surname. Notable people with the surname include:

Greg Vanderjagt (born 1984), American basketball player
Guy Vander Jagt (1931–2007), American politician
Jan van der Jagt (1924–2001), Dutch politician and architect
Mike Vanderjagt (born 1970), Canadian football player and American football player

Surnames of Dutch origin